James Walker Leslie (12 July 1908 – 15 June 1980) was a Scottish footballer who played as a right back. His only club at senior level was Kilmarnock where he spent 12 years, though he played in only 10 matches in his first four years at Rugby Park and was not involved in the run when they won the Scottish Cup in 1929; however he was a regular by the time they reached its final again in 1932, this time losing out to Rangers after a replay. He missed almost the entire 1933–34 season due to injury, but signed a new contract after recovering. Leslie left Kilmarnock in 1938 and was briefly on the books at Queen of the South at the end of that year, but did not play any official matches for them.

References

Scottish footballers
1908 births
1980 deaths
Footballers from East Ayrshire
Association football fullbacks
Kilmarnock F.C. players
Scottish Junior Football Association players
Scottish Football League players